Neomochtherus is a genus of robber flies in the family Asilidae. There are at least 140 described species in Neomochtherus.

See also
 List of Neomochtherus species

References

Further reading

External links

 
 
 

Asilidae
Asilidae genera
Taxa named by Carl Robert Osten-Sacken